NorQuest College is a publicly funded community college in Edmonton, Alberta, Canada. The student body is approximately 10,900 full-time or part-time credit students, and approximately 8,500 non-credit or continuing education students. Approximately 1,600 students graduate each year.

History
NorQuest College, formerly Alberta Vocational College (AVC), was officially established by the Government of Alberta in 1965 with the primary objective of providing untrained and under-employed Albertans with the opportunity to develop skills required in an industrialized workforce. In 1965, AVC consisted of four academic upgrading classrooms, a space housing 60 business education students, a barber shop, a beauty culture lab, and a welding and equipment maintenance shop. There were additional programs offered at separate locations in Edmonton. With government plans to construct a central downtown site for the college in 1970, these programs would all be offered under the same roof by 1971 and total student enrollment would rise to 2,300 in 1972 from 550 in 1966. New programs were developed and existing programs expanded and revised to accommodate the educational needs of an increasing student body.

Governance
NorQuest College became board governed in 1998 and operates under the authority of the Post-secondary Learning Act and is responsible to the Minister of Advanced Education. The board has 14 members.

Campus
The college has one Edmonton campus in downtown, and a regional campus in Wetaskiwin. There are also two correctional institute campuses in the Edmonton area: high school credit courses and non-credit personal development courses are provided to inmates at the Edmonton Remand Centre and the Fort Saskatchewan Correctional Centre; and employment training courses are offered at the Fort Saskatchewan Correctional Centre. Approximately 150 students are taking these courses at one time.

Programs 
NorQuest College offers diplomas and certificates as well as preparatory programs. Programs are offered full-time, part-time, online, and via a hybrid of online and in-person instruction. NorQuest College offers one of the largest and highly rated practical nursing programs within Canada. In addition to health, human services and business career programs, NorQuest offers adult literacy, English as a Second Language (ESL), intercultural education, Aboriginal education, academic upgrading, and learner supports for students with disabilities.

See also
List of universities and colleges in Alberta
Education in Alberta
Canadian Interuniversity Sport
Canadian government scientific research organizations
Canadian university scientific research organizations
Canadian industrial research and development organizations

References

External links

NorQuest College website

Universities and colleges in Edmonton
Colleges in Alberta
1965 establishments in Alberta
Educational institutions established in 1965